Yakir Gueron or Preciado Gueron (1813 – February 4, 1874 in Jerusalem) was a Turkish rabbi. He was the sixth rabbi of Adrianople descended from the Gueron family. He became rabbi in 1835 at the age of twenty-two, and eleven years later met Sultan Abd al-Majid, whom he induced to restore the privileges formerly conceded to the non-Muslim communities. Gueron, with the rabbis of İzmir and Seres, was made an arbitrator in a rabbinical controversy at Constantinople, and was chosen acting chief rabbi of the Turkish capital in 1863. Both Abdulmecid I and his successor Abdülaziz conferred decorations upon him.

Gueron resigned his office in 1872, and proceeded to Jerusalem, where he died two years later.

References
Singer, Isidore and Abraham Danon. "Gueron, Yakir (Preciado)." Jewish Encyclopedia. Funk and Wagnalls, 1901-1906, citing:
Ha-Lebanon, x., No. 30.

1813 births
1874 deaths
Chief rabbis of the Ottoman Empire
19th-century rabbis from the Ottoman Empire
Sephardi rabbis in Ottoman Palestine